L'ang Khum Proloeng is a 2008 Cambodian horror film starring Heng Bunleap and Keo Pich Pisey.

Cambodian horror films
2008 films
2008 horror films